Stephanas (Stephanas, meaning "crowned", from , stephanoó, "to crown")  was a member of the church at Corinth, whose family were among the limited number of believers whom Paul the apostle had baptized there  and whom Paul refers to as the “first-fruits of Achaia”.

He is mentioned by Paul in :
I was glad when Stephanas, Fortunatus and Achaicus arrived, because they have supplied what was lacking from you
Teignmouth Shore, writing in Ellicott's Commentary for Modern Readers, suggests that Stephanas, Fortunatus and Achaicus had come from Corinth to Ephesus, probably with the letter from the Corinthians to which Paul was sending a response. Paul urged the church in Corinth to "be in subjection to such men and to everyone who helps in the work and labours" and to "acknowledge such men".

Stephanas has been supposed by some to have been the repentant “jailer of Philippi” (comp. Acts 16:33). The First Epistle to the Corinthians was written from Ephesus some six years after the jailer's conversion, and he was with the apostle there at that time.

References 

Christian saints from the New Testament
Christianity in Roman Corinth
1st-century Greek people
First Epistle to the Corinthians